Delaplain is an unincorporated community located in Scott County, Kentucky, United States.

References

Unincorporated communities in Scott County, Kentucky
Unincorporated communities in Kentucky